Partridge Place, Alberta may refer to:

Partridge Place, Rocky View County, Alberta, a locality in Rocky View County, Alberta
Partridge Place, Parkland County, Alberta, a locality in Parkland County, Alberta